The 30th National Film Awards, presented by Directorate of Film Festivals, the organisation set up by Ministry of Information and Broadcasting, India to felicitate the best of Indian Cinema released in the year 1982. Ceremony took place in May 1983 and awards were given by then President of India, Giani Zail Singh.

With 30th National Film Awards, new category for Best Non-Feature Film on Family Welfare was introduced.

Juries 

Three different committees were formed for feature films, short films and books on cinema, headed by veteran director Hrishikesh Mukherjee, Durga Khote and K. K. Nair respectively.

 Jury Members: Feature Films
 Hrishikesh Mukherjee (Chairperson)N. B. KamathAmita MalikKomala VaradanV. ShivaramanK. V. SubbannaGirish KasaravalliValampuri SomanathanKanchanaManzoorAnil VarshneyNabendu GhoshSubodh RoyKamal Bose
 Jury Members: Short Films
 Durga Khote (Chairperson)S. KrishnaswamySiddharth Kak
 Jury Members: Books on Cinema
 K. K. Nair (Chairperson)Swapan MullickSamik BandyopadhyayBikram SinghSuresh KohliThakazhi Sivasankara PillaiOmcheri N. N. PillaiK. S. SrinivasanKaa. Naa. Subramaniam

Awards 

Awards were divided into feature films, non-feature films and books written on Indian cinema.

Lifetime Achievement Award

Feature films 

Feature films were awarded at All India as well as regional level. For 30th National Film Awards, a Bengali film, Chokh won the National Film Award for Best Feature Film whereas a Telugu film, Meghasandesam won the maximum number of awards (four). Following were the awards given in each category:

All India Award 

Following were the awards given:

Regional Award 

The awards were given to the best films made in the regional languages of India. For feature films in Gujarati, Kashmiri and Punjabi language, award for Best Feature Film was not given.

Non-Feature films 

Following were the awards given:

Best Writing on Cinema 

Following were the awards given:

Awards not given 

Following were the awards not given as no film was found to be suitable for the award:

 Best Cinematography (Black and White)
 Best Children's Film
 Best Lyrics
 Best Popular Film Providing Wholesome Entertainment
 Best Film on Social Documentation
 Best Promotional Film
 Best Newsreel Cameraman
 Best Feature Film in English
 Best Feature Film in Manipuri
 Best Feature Film in Oriya
 Best Feature Film in Punjabi

References

External links 
 National Film Awards Archives
 Official Page for Directorate of Film Festivals, India

National Film Awards (India) ceremonies
1983 Indian film awards